Un-word of the year is an annual selection of one new or recently popularized term that violates human rights or infringes upon democratic principles, made by a panel of German linguists. The term may be one that discriminates against societal groups or may be euphemistic, disguising or misleading. The term is chosen from suggestions sent in by the public. The choice of the word does not depend on how many times it was suggested, but reflects the judgement of the panel. The core of the panel consists of four linguists and one journalist. The un-word of the previous year is announced every January.

The linguistic action was started in 1994 by the linguist . The yearly publication of the "un-words of the year" is today widely reported in German media and very popular among Germans. In 2007, the president of the German PEN association, Johano Strasser, criticized the selections as being "themselves a symptom of the language neglect that it pretends to be able to heal" and having the quality of Deutschland sucht den Superstar (a popular German talent show).

History
Between 1991 and 1993, the un-word was announced by the Gesellschaft für deutsche Sprache, alongside the Word of the Year. In 1994, following a row with the then German government led by Helmut Kohl, the jury led by linguist Horst Dieter Schlosser decided to become independent of any state-funded institution.

List of un-words of the year since 1991

In 1999, the jury chose  as un-word of the 20th century.

See also
Word of the year
Word of the year (Germany)
Youth word of the year (Germany)

References

Word of the year
German language
1992 establishments in Germany
Ironic and humorous awards